Has Fallen is an American action thriller film series starring Gerard Butler as United States Secret Service agent Mike Banning. The series includes the films Olympus Has Fallen (2013), London Has Fallen (2016), and Angel Has Fallen (2019). The films also star Aaron Eckhart as U.S. President Benjamin Asher, and Morgan Freeman as the Speaker of the House (and eventual President) Allan Trumbull. The films have received generally mixed critical reception and have grossed a combined total of $523 million worldwide.

The film series will continue, as Butler has signed on for three more feature films. With plans to expand into a franchise, producers have various foreign, local-language, TV spin-offs in development.

Films

Olympus Has Fallen (2013)

After a failed attempt to save First Lady Margaret Asher, disgraced Secret Service agent Mike Banning must take action after a North Korean terrorist group seize control of the White House. Banning uses his inside knowledge to rescue President Benjamin Asher from his kidnappers.

London Has Fallen (2016)

During the funeral of the British Prime Minister in London, the city is attacked by a large army of Islamic terrorists, killing five world leaders, damaging major landmarks and generating into mass panic, masterminded by Pakistani arms dealer and terrorist leader Aamir Barkawi. When President Benjamin Asher gets kidnapped by the terrorists, Secret Service agent Mike Banning must once again save President Asher.

Angel Has Fallen (2019)

Mike Banning is framed for the attempt to assassinate President Allan Trumbull by a rogue private military company and must race against time to clear his name while uncovering the real threat.

Night Has Fallen (TBA) 
In November 2019, Alan Siegel announced that three additional Has Fallen films are in development. In November 2020, the fourth film, titled Night Has Fallen, was given the greenlight with Butler confirmed to reprise his role as Mike Banning in addition to serving as producer.  Waugh will return to the series as director, with a script he co-wrote with Kamen. The project will be a joint-venture production between G-BASE, Eclectic Pictures, Campbell Grobman Films, and Millennium Media. Alan Siegel, Heidi Jo Markel, Les Weldon, Jeffrey Greenstein, Jonathan Yunger, and Yariv Lerner will also serve as producers.

Future
Following the release of Night Has Fallen, at least two more movies will follow. In addition to the movies, Millennium Media has plans to expand the film series into a franchise with the addition of television spin-offs being considered.

Television
In November 2019, it was announced that multiple television series spin-offs were being developed. Because of the film series' popularity in other territories, it was announced that plans include various television series to debut in foreign countries, with the idea being that each show's local mother tongues will be the spoken languages. Siegel stated that the intent for TV show installments, would be to expand the franchise and add additional characters to appear in future films. In November of the following year, the studio confirmed development for a television series is on-going.

In November 2021, Head of Millennium Media Jeffrey Greenstein confirmed that a Has Fallen television series is in development and a priority for the studio.

Cast and characters

Additional crew and production details

Reception

Box office performance

Critical and public response

References

Action film series
American film series
 
Film series introduced in 2013